Hemorrhois nummifer, also known as the coin-marked snake, Asian racer, and leaden-colored racer, is a species of snake belonging to the family Colubridae. It is found in southeastern Europe, Western and Central Asia, and northeast Africa.

Geographic range 
Hemorrhois nummifer is found widely in Western and Central Asia (Turkey southward to Syria, Lebanon, northern and central Israel, western and northwestern Jordan, and eastward to Armenia, northern Iraq, northeastern Iran, Turkmenistan, southern Uzbekistan, Tajikistan, and Kyrgyzstan) and also occurs in extreme southeastern Europe (Greece: the Aegean islands, including Kalymnos, Kos, and Lipsi; Cyprus). Isolated populations exist in northern Egypt (near Cairo and in the southern Sinai Peninsula).

Description 
The body is strong and fairly robustly built. It is brown, grey, or olive grey above and often has a dorsal row of about 57–65 large spots, turning into a continuous line on the tail. Smaller spots complement the larger spots on the sides. The belly is grey white.

Habitat
Hemorrhois nummifer occurs in open areas, including open dry woodland and shrubland, with some rocks and bushy vegetation. It is an adaptable species that inhabits both rural and urban areas.

Behaviour and ecology
This snake is a diurnal, actively foraging predator with a diet consisting mainly of small mammals, lizards, and small birds. It is harmless to humans but appears to mimic vipers both in appearance and behaviourally (i.e., Batesian mimicry).

References

External links 
 From an Italian site about reptiles and amphibians in Europe
 Asian racer entry from Israeli nature web site

nummifer
Snakes of Africa
Snakes of Asia
Reptiles of Central Asia
Reptiles of Europe
Reptiles of North Africa
Reptiles of Armenia
Reptiles of Cyprus
Reptiles of Iran
Reptiles of Iraq
Snakes of Jordan
Reptiles of Syria
Reptiles of Turkey
Reptiles described in 1834
Taxa named by Adolph Reuss
Articles containing video clips